Adaköy can refer to:

 Adaköy, Çaycuma
 Adaköy, Gümüşova
 Adaköy, Kızılcahamam
 Adaköy, Sarayköy
 Adaköy, Yeniçağa